Archiearinae is a subfamily of the geometer moth family (Geometridae). It was described by David Stephen Fletcher in 1953.

Genera
The subfamily contains the following genera:

Acalyphes Turner, 1926
Archiearides D. S. Fletcher, 1953
Archiearis Hübner, 1823
Boudinotiana Leraut, 2002 
Caenosynteles Dyar, 1912
Dirce Prout, 1910
Lachnocephala D. S. Fletcher, 1953
Leucobrephos Grote, 1874

References

External links
Archiearinae on Fauna Europaea

 
Geometridae
Moth subfamilies